"House of Cards" is a song written and recorded by American country music artist Mary Chapin Carpenter.  it was released in March 1995 as the third single from the album Stones in the Road.  The song reached #21 on the Billboard Hot Country Singles & Tracks chart.

Content
The narrator sings of growing up in a small home in a small community, reflecting on knowing the “groan of every stair” in the house and the “name of every street” in the town.  She reflects that while these small communities and homes seem perfect and ideal to an outsider, they hide their own secrets and perils, and that everyone’s greatest fear is that their “house of cards” will be discovered and everything will crash down around them.

Music video
The music video begins by showing a family smiling happily for a family photo.  Once the photo is taken, the façade falls away and the fighting, despair, and turmoil of the family is revealed. The father is an alcoholic who is buried in his work and talking to a mistress on the phone, the mother is mentally overwhelmed trying to hold up the image of her "perfect" family and chain smokes as a way to escape her reality as she works on a stack of Christmas cards. The older child struggles with beauty and self-esteem issues, while the younger child, feeling like he is caught in the crossfire of the family turmoil, retreats to the attic of the home, where he builds a large house of playing cards which in the end crashes to the ground.

Personnel
Kenny Aronoff – drums
Mary Chapin Carpenter – lead and background vocals, acoustic guitar
Don Dixon – bass guitar
John Jennings – electric guitar, background vocals
Steuart Smith – electric guitar
Benmont Tench – Hammond C-3 organ

Chart performance

References

1995 singles
1994 songs
Mary Chapin Carpenter songs
Songs written by Mary Chapin Carpenter
Columbia Records singles